Sam Littlemore, also known as Sam La More, is an Australian record producer, songwriter and recording artist working in Sydney and Los Angeles. Littlemore, a member of dance music trio Pnau, is best known for the international number one song Cold Heart (Pnau Remix) by Elton John & Dua Lipa (2021) which he and fellow members of Pnau co-wrote and produced. He is also known for his involvement in the production of "What You Waiting For?" (2004) by Gwen Stefani, Pnau songs "Go Bang", "Chameleon" and "Changes" (2013) by Faul & Wad Ad vs. Pnau, "Can't Get Better Than This" (2012) by Parachute Youth, "High" (2013) and "Fire" (2018) by Peking Duk, "Don't Hold Back" (2007) by The Potbelleez and songs with Nellee Hooper, Rick Nowels, Nelly Furtado on Loose (2006), Arthur Baker, Pnau and Tonite Only. He has won multiple ARIA and APRA Awards.

Biography 
Samuel Littlemore was born 2 February 1975 in Sydney, Australia, and raised in Wahroonga. Littlemore attended Barker College in Hornsby and the College of Fine Arts at the University of New South Wales, where he received a Bachelor of Fine Arts (Honours, 1st Class) majoring in new media art.

In 1998 Littlemore co-founded Selenium Interactive, a new media design agency. Producing work for Australian and international clients including Coca-Cola, HSBC, TWI / IMG, Indy, Greater Union and Sony PlayStation, the 23-year-old creative director ran design teams in Sydney and London. Within 18 months, they had opened offices in San Francisco, Hong Kong and Shanghai. In 2000, he sold his share to pursue a career as a recording artist.

Littlemore's first foray into the music business came through his younger brother Nick's ARIA Award-winning band Pnau, one of Australia's most respected electronic music duos. From 2001 to present, Littlemore has intermittently acted as co-producer, co-writer and co-performer. He and his brother Nick played together to crowds in excess of 12,000 people (e.g. Big Day Out, Good Vibrations Festival, BBC Radio 1 Miami Winter Music Conference) with Fatboy Slim, Erick Morillo, Derrick Carter and Darren Emerson among others.

Littlemore relocated to London in 2001 to produce with Darren Emerson (Underworld) who released his debut single "Takin' Hold" as Sam La More. Topping the Buzz, Cool Cuts and Hype charts, "Takin' Hold" was also Pete Tong's Essential New Tune and single of the week for DMC's Update magazine. Along with label mate Tim Deluxe's "It Just Won't Do" it helped to propel Underwater Records to "Label of The Year 2003" (DJ Magazine).

In 2004, Littlemore started producing pop music, teaming up with London producer Nellee Hooper, they produced Gwen Stefani's debut solo single "What You Waiting For?". In Los Angeles they produced six more songs with her. "What You Waiting For?" went on to be the number 1 single in Australia for a number of weeks.

Littlemore continued working out of London and Los Angeles, songwriting, producing and remixing artists including Pnau, Kaskade, Freestylers, Sneaky Sound System, Robbie Williams, Gus Gus, TV Rock, The Similou, P. Diddy / Kelis, Empire of the Sun, Cassidy, Ladytron, The Doors, ESG, Mutiny, Random House Project / Robert Owens, Percy Filth and Teenager.

In 2006 Littlemore co-founded the band Tonite Only. Ministry of Sound licensed their two debut songs "Danger (The Bomb)" and "Where the Party's At" internationally. They remixed "All This Love" for The Similou, which spent 11 weeks at number one in the ARIA Club Chart, followed up by 18 weeks at number one for the Tonite Only remix of "Pictures" by  Sneaky Sound System, equaling the record set by Madison Avenue's "Don't Call Me Baby". In addition to remixes for Princess Superstar, TV Rock and others, they released the Ministry of Sound compilation "Mashed III". They went on to regularly tour North America and had numerous crossover hits including "We Run The Nite", voted Best Dance Track Of The Year 2011 by InTheMix.

2007 saw Littlemore re-establish his solo career as Sam La More, touring Australia, New Zealand, Japan, Europe and North America. He mixed the Pacha compilation for Europe and Australia and co-wrote and produced the third, self-titled Pnau album with his brother Nick and bandmate Peter Mayes. The self-titled Pnau album was highlighted by Elton John as his favourite new album featuring singles "Embrace", "With you Forever", "Baby" and "Wild Strawberries". His production and songwriting skills can also be heard on "Don't Hold Back" and "Are You With Me?" for The Potbelleez. Both songs spent many weeks in the ARIA top 10, ARIA club and ARIA dance charts. Littlemore then moved his focus to finishing singles for other artists including Peking Duk, Parachute Youth, The Potbelleez among others.

In 2015, Littlemore's White Shadows album with Nick Littlemore and Craig Nicholls was released featuring the single "Give Up, Give Out, Give In".

In 2016, Littlemore officially joined Pnau. "Chameleon", their first single as a trio, peaked at number four on the ARIA Singles Chart and reached triple platinum sales in Australia. "Chameleon" was nominated for the Apple Music Song of the Year and won the Best Dance Release at the 2017 ARIA Awards.

In 2017 Pnau released the album Changa to commercial and critical acclaim.

In 2018 Pnau's "Go Bang" won the ARIA Award for Best Dance Release, setting a new record of three ARIA Best Dance Release wins.

In 2021 Elton John asked Pnau to revisit his catalogue and produce a new album which resulted in the single Cold Heart with Elton John and Dua Lipa. The single reached number one in the UK.

Littlemore continues to write, produce and mix records in Avalon, Sydney.

Discography

Productions

Remixes

Releases

References

1975 births
Living people
University of New South Wales alumni
Australian record producers
People educated at Barker College
Pnau members